Irakli Turmanidze (born 13 December 1984 in Kobuleti) is a Georgian weightlifter. He competed at the 2012 Summer Olympics in the +105 kg event. He won a Bronze medal at the 2016 Summer Olympics in the +105kg weight division.

Major results

References

External links
 

1984 births
Living people
People from Kobuleti
Male weightlifters from Georgia (country)
Olympic weightlifters of Georgia (country)
Olympic bronze medalists for Georgia (country)
Olympic medalists in weightlifting
Weightlifters at the 2012 Summer Olympics
Weightlifters at the 2016 Summer Olympics
Medalists at the 2016 Summer Olympics
European Weightlifting Championships medalists
21st-century people from Georgia (country)